John Dominic Guthridge (1912–1995) was a British film editor. He worked with director Basil Dearden on films such as Sapphire (1959) and Victim

Selected filmography
 Vice Versa (1948)
 Look Before You Love (1948)
 My Sister and I (1948)
 The Reluctant Widow (1950)
 The Woman in Question (1950)
 The Browning Version (1951)
 Made in Heaven (1952)
 The Importance of Being Earnest (1952)
 Desperate Moment (1953)
 Hell Below Zero (1954)
 An Alligator Named Daisy (1955)
 Tiger in the Smoke (1956)
 Jumping for Joy (1956)
 Rockets Galore! (1957)
 Hell Drivers (1957)
 Sapphire (1959)
 The League of Gentlemen (1960)
 Victim (1961)
 The Mind Benders (1963)
 Woman of Straw (1964)
 Masquerade (1965)
 Shalako (1968)

References

Bibliography 
 Emma Bell & Neil Mitchell. Directory of World Cinema: Britain. Intellect Books, 2012.

External links 
 

1912 births
1995 deaths
British film editors